Ivar Odnes (25 May 1963 – 5 October 2018) was a Norwegian politician for the Centre Party.

He served as a deputy representative to the Parliament of Norway from Oppland during the term 2013–2017. He hails from Østre Toten and was from 2011 the deputy county mayor of Oppland.

He was also the deputy chair of Norsk Kulturarv.

References

1963 births
2018 deaths
People from Østre Toten
Deputy members of the Storting
Centre Party (Norway) politicians
Oppland politicians
Deaths from cancer in Norway